The men's singles was one of five events of the 1920 World Hard Court Championships tennis tournament held in Paris, France from 22 until 30 May 1920. The draw consisted of 30 players. Anthony Wilding was the defending champion, but did not participate. William Laurentz defeated compatriot André Gobert in the final to win the Championship.

Draw

Finals

Top half

Bottom half

References 

Men's Singles